Under the Radar Over the Top is the fourteenth studio album by German hard dance group Scooter. The album was released in Germany on 2 October 2009, preceded by the single "J'adore Hardcore" on 14 August. A second single, "Ti Sento", was released on the same day as the album. The album was released in the UK on 23 November 2009. The third single "The Sound Above My Hair" was released on 27 November 2009., and "Stuck on Replay", the 4th single from the album is being used as the official theme song of 2010 IIHF World Championship.

The album's cover was photographed at the former American NSA espionage site Teufelsberg in Berlin. The title comes from Alexis Petridis' Guardian article about the group's unexpected UK success in 2008.

The album's release was supported by a German tour in March 2010. The album went Gold the same year.

Track listing

Limited edition
A limited edition version of the album features a second CD entitled The Dark Side Edition and a bonus DVD.

The Dark Side Edition track listing

The DVD features a personal Scooter travelogue from the band’s trip through Australia, Africa and Asia as well as an exclusive interview and selected comments on the album.

20 Years of Hardcore Expanded Edition
This version, released in 2013, contains the standard album (possibly remastered) and a bonus disc that contains remixes, b-sides, and selected versions of tracks. The bonus disc's track list is as follows:

J'adore Hardcore ('The Melbourne' Club Mix)
J'adore Hardcore (Megastylez Remix)
Dushbag
J'adore Hardcore (Eric Chase Remix)
Ti Sento (V.I.P. Room Club Mix)
Scarborough Reloaded
Ti Sento (Lissat & Voltaxx Remix)
The Sound Above My Hair (Radio Edit)
Lucullus
The Sound Above My Hair (Electro Mix)
Stuck On Replay (The Club Mix)
P.U.C.K.

Deluxe VIP Fan Box

A second, even more limited edition of the album, entitled the Under The Radar Over The Top Deluxe VIP Fan Box, includes the same content as the Limited Edition version along with a Scooter flag, Scooter dog tags, and 5 post cards featuring the band members, and a special box featuring images from the photoshoot of the NSA location on the cover of the album.

UK edition
The UK version features a different cover and includes a DVD with all the group's music videos from "Hyper Hyper" to "Jump That Rock (Whatever You Want)", similar to the German re-release of Jumping All Over the World. The album sold 8,000 copies in the first week after release and entered the official UK album charts at number 62.

Charts

In 2010. It was awarded a gold certification from the Independent Music Companies Association which indicated sales of at least 100,000 copies throughout Europe.

Certifications

Notes
 "Stealth" contains voice samples from sample pack "Vengeance Essential Clubsounds Vol.3" created by Manuel Schleis. It also samples the alien transmission from the film Contact.
 "J'adore Hardcore" uses French fan Maddy's voice for the eponym lyrics "J'adore Hardcore" and samples Planet Funk's 2001 single "Chase The Sun", from the 2002 album Non Zero Sumness as well as the 2009 songs "Lullaby" by Activator and uses a sample that is heavily inspired by the melody of the track "I Just Can't Stop" by The Pitcher. On 30 July 2009, during the video shoot for the single, H.P. Baxxter was almost a victim of a car bomb attack in Majorca, Spain.
 "Ti Sento" is inspired by the song of the same name by Technoboy, which itself samples Matia Bazar's 1985 single "Ti Sento". The song by Scooter includes Italian vocals by Antonella Ruggiero, who was the vocal performer in the original version. Playing an opera singer, Ruggiero also appears in the accompanying music video, which premièred on 18 September 2009. The sound effects at the beginning of the song are from "Music or Noize" by Wildstylez. It also uses the melody from the song "Sonic Sabotage" by Crypsis & Kold Konexion.
 "State of Mind" samples the song "Pale" by Within Temptation and uses a sample that is heavily inspired be the melody of the track "Next Dimensional World" by Technoboy.
 "Where the Beats..." samples its intro and melody from Technoboy's version of "Ti Sento", Some parts sampling "Cold Rocking" by Wildstylez & The Prophet, while the melodic female vocals and lyrics are very similar to Celtic Woman's version of the Irish folk song Carrickfergus (song) albeit with altered lyrics.
 "Bit A Bad Boy" samples the Krezip song "I Would Stay" and the melody also samples "Rock Civilization" by Headhunterz.
 "The Sound Above My Hair" samples the Black Song "Wonderful Life".
 "See You Smile" samples the song "Rainbow In The Sky" by DJ Paul Elstak. The melody also samples Rephex & ABW's "Nuclear".
 The melody of "Clic Clac" comes from Pinocchio's theme, written by Italian composer Fiorenzo Carpi De Resmini. The track also samples Technoboy's "Put Some Grace (In Your Face)" and Tuneboy's "Re-Generate It".
 "Second Skin" is a cover of the same name song by The Chameleons.
 "Stuck on Replay" is based on the melody of "DJ Phil Ty - A Kay A (EHM remix)", next to sampling Lionel Richie's "Stuck On You".
 "Metropolis" samples Ron Van den Beuken's remix of Randy Katana's "In Silence".
 On the back of the Album cover for the DVD version of Under the Radar Over the Top there is a spelling mistake for The Question is What is The Question.
 "Marian (Version)" is a cover of the same name song by The Sisters of Mercy.

External links
 Scooter Official Site
 Purchase At Amazon.co.uk
 The Sound Above My Hair Official Video

References

2009 albums
Scooter (band) albums